Judo at the 1986 Commonwealth Games was the first time that Judo at the Commonwealth Games was included as a sport. It was however just as a demonstration sport (alongside canoeing) and did not contribute towards the medal table. The sport took place at Meadowbank Stadium and saw full capacity attendances. The event like many at the 1986 Games was affected by the boycott of multiple nations.

Results

References

1986 Commonwealth Games events
1986 in judo
1986
Judo in Scotland
Judo competitions in the United Kingdom